Brittany Brown (born April 18, 1995) is an American sprinter. She won the silver medal at the 2019 World Championships in the 200 m event. Attending Claremont High School she set the all time 100m school record with a time of 11.49(+2.2) and the wind legal school record of 11.59(+1.7) both of which still stand. Going alongside her 100m school records she also set the all time 200m record with a time of 23.68(+3.1) and the wind legal record of 23.79(+.6).

References

External links

 
 

1995 births
Living people
American female sprinters
World Athletics Championships athletes for the United States
World Athletics Championships medalists
USA Indoor Track and Field Championships winners
Place of birth missing (living people)
21st-century American women
Iowa Hawkeyes women's track and field athletes